George Bradbury (October 10, 1770 – November 7, 1823) was a U.S. Representative from Massachusetts. He also served one term (1822) in the Maine Senate, representing Cumberland County, Maine.

Born in Falmouth in the Province of Massachusetts Bay, Bradbury graduated from Harvard University in 1789. He studied law. He was admitted to the bar and commenced practice in Portland, Maine (until 1820 a district of Massachusetts). He served as member of the Massachusetts House of Representatives 1806–1812.

Bradbury was elected as a Federalist to the Thirteenth and Fourteenth Congresses (March 4, 1813 – March 3, 1817).
He was an unsuccessful candidate for renomination in 1816. He resumed the practice of law. He served as associate clerk of the Portland Court 1817–1820. He served as member of the State senate in 1822. He died in Portland, Maine, November 7, 1823, and was interred in Portland's Eastern Cemetery.

Sources

1770 births
1823 deaths
Harvard University alumni
Members of the United States House of Representatives from the District of Maine
Politicians from Portland, Maine
Burials at Eastern Cemetery
Federalist Party members of the United States House of Representatives from Massachusetts
Maine state senators
Maine Federalists
People from Falmouth, Massachusetts
People of colonial Massachusetts